Penderyn may refer to:

Penderyn (whisky), a whisky produced by Penderyn Distillery
Penderyn, Rhondda Cynon Taf, a village in Wales
Penderyn transmitting station, near the village
Moel Penderyn, a hill near the village
Dyffrynnoedd Nedd a Mellte, a Moel Penderyn, a Site of Special Scientific Interest that includes Moel Penderyn
Vaynor and Penderyn High School
Richard Lewis (1807/8–1831), known as Dic Penderyn, a Welsh man executed for his part in the Merthyr Rising 1831

See also